Cursed, later renamed The Weber Show, is an American sitcom television series that ran on NBC from October 26, 2000 to April 26, 2001. It starred Steven Weber, Amy Pietz, Wendell Pierce, and Chris Elliott.

Overview
The show is notable for having an abrupt title change in the middle of its first season.  The initial premise was that its protagonist (Weber) had been cursed by an ex-girlfriend and thus constantly encountered bad luck.  The show failed to find an audience, and so midway through the season the entire "bad luck" angle was abruptly dropped.  The show was revamped as a more traditional sitcom and renamed The Weber Show.  In spite of the change (or perhaps because of it), the show still struggled and was canceled at the end of the season, leaving a cliffhanger unresolved.  The show's theme song was written and performed by Liz Phair.

Cast
Steven Weber as Jack Nagle
Amy Pietz as Melissa Taylor
Chris Elliott as Larry Heckman
Wendell Pierce as Wendell Simms
Paula Marshall as Katie

Episodes

References

External links
 
 

2000 American television series debuts
2000s American sitcoms
2001 American television series endings
English-language television shows
NBC original programming
Television series by Universal Television
Television shows set in Chicago